"Voices Carry" is a 1985 song by American new wave band 'Til Tuesday

Voices Carry may also refer to:

In music:
 Voices Carry (album), the 1985 'Til Tuesday album containing the song of the same name

In books:
Voices Carry, novel by Mariah Stewart 2001
Voices Carry, autobiography by playwright Ying Ruocheng 2009, China's Vice Minister of Culture from 1986 to 1990

In film and TV:
 "Voices Carry", a 1999 episode of Diagnosis: Murder
 "Voices Carry", a 2004 episode of Degrassi: The Next Generation
 "Voices Carry", a 2005 episode of The 4400
 "Voices Carry", a 2012 episode of Welcome to Sweetie Pie's
 "Voices Carry", a 2015 episode of Royal Pains